Zurich  is a village the north of the Netherlands. It is located in Súdwest-Fryslân, Friesland.

History 
In 1352 the place was mentioned as Zuderinghe, in 1353 as Zudrineghe, in 1399 as Sudringe, in 1482 as Surich, in 1505 as Suyrich, in 1579 as Surich, and at the end of the 17th century in Frisian as Swrich. The place-name probably indicates something southern, what is unclear.

The name is very similar to Zürich and in English identical. As a result, the village receives many visitors, including from Switzerland. Therefore a 2000 plan of the municipality of Wonseradeel, to change from the Dutch Zurich to the Frysian Surch was opposed by the villagers. Hence the municipality withdrew the proposal.

On 1 January 1830, the village had 152 inhabitants. Due to the construction of the Afsluitdijk, the population increased, and in 1958 340 people lived there. Since the road to the Afsluitdijk no longer runs through the village, the population has decreased again. In 2011 there were 168 villagers. In January 2017, Zurich had a population of around 190. In 2019 and 2020 Zurich had 145 inhabitants.

Photogallery

References

External links

Súdwest-Fryslân
Populated places in Friesland